Professor He Zehui or Ho Zah-wei (March 5, 1914 – June 20, 2011) was a Chinese nuclear physicist who worked to develop and exploit nuclear physics in Germany and China.

Early life and education

He Zehui was born in Suzhou in 1914. She attended , a predecessor of Suzhou No.10 Middle School where she was interested in a variety of subjects and was on the volleyball team. Her family is famous for producing three renowned women scientists. In addition to He Zehui, her older sister He Yizhen was an authority in spectroscopy and material science, and her younger sister He Zeying was a distinguished botanist. She was the cousin of Wang Ming-Chen. They both sometimes credited as "The Chinese Madame Curie".

He Zehui graduated from Tsinghua University in Beijing in 1936, with a degree in physics. She then went on to study at the Technical University of Berlin, where she was the top student in her class, outperforming her future husband Qian Sanqiang.

Career
She was sent to Germany because the Germans were interested in high technology ordnance. She earned a Ph.D in Engineering in 1940 with her thesis that dealt with a new way of measuring the speed of high velocity bullets. She studied nuclear physics for several years in Germany working for Siemens before joining the Kaiser Wilhelm Institute (now the Max Planck Institute for Medical Research) in Heidelberg in 1943. Friedrich Paschen who had been her landlord in Germany, and later an adopted parent, introduced her to Walther Bothe, who had just built the first German cyclotron. With Bothe's assistance she studied radioactive particles and cosmic rays, and she worked on Heinz Maier-Leibnitz's cloud chamber technology.

Her work was published in the leading scientific journal Nature, (1945 Nature, Vol. 156 p 543) after she presented a paper in Bristol on her work with Maier-Leibnitz and Bothe which included the very first picture of a positron–electron scatter. After World War II she and her husband, Qian Sanqiang, went to work in Paris at the Marie Curie Institute in 1946. She studied and confirmed the phenomena of nuclear fission and the couple returned to China in 1948.

When they returned to China she was employed at the National Peking Research Academy as their only Nuclear Research Institute research fellow. She and her husband decided to stay after the communists took power in China and despite their foreign relationships, her husband was given the authority to spend large sums abroad on scientific equipment. In 1955 her husband was asked to develop an atomic bomb by the Chinese Government. The following year He Zehui won the third place Science Award given by the Chinese Academy of Sciences for work in creating nuclear emulsions.

After this, He Zehui led the Neutron Physics Research Office, a Chinese parallel to the Atomic Energy Institute. She worked on many problems associated with nuclear weapons and their testing. The Chinese state built their first nuclear reactor and cyclotron with Russian assistance in the 1950s, and they developed a nuclear bomb and a hydrogen bomb that were both successfully tested in the 1960s.

In 1966, the Cultural Revolution began and she had few public events until 1973. After this she turned her attention to cosmic rays and high energy astrophysics. She now was able to travel and she fostered international collaboration with visits to Germany, CERN, and other countries.

Awards and honors
Throughout her life, she continued to work on high energy physics. She was elected to the Chinese Academy of Sciences in 1980. She became an iconic figure in China. The science laboratories at her old school are named in her honour.

Personal life
Her husband died in 1992. They had three children, two girls and a boy. He Zehui died in Beijing in 2011, at the age of 97.

References

1914 births
2011 deaths
20th-century women scientists
Cosmic ray physicists
Chinese nuclear physicists
Chinese women physicists
Members of the Chinese Academy of Sciences
Physicists from Jiangsu
Scientists from Suzhou
Technical University of Berlin alumni
Tsinghua University alumni
Women nuclear physicists